is a railway station in Konagai Town, Isahaya, Nagasaki Prefecture, Japan. It is operated by JR Kyushu and is on the Nagasaki Main Line.

Lines

Station layout 
The station consists of an island platform serving two tracks on an embankment. The station building is across a road and is unstaffed, serving only as a waiting room. Access to the platform is by means of an underpass through the embankment.

Adjacent stations

History
JR Kyushu opened the station on 10 March 1990 as an additional station on the existing track of the Nagasaki Main Line.

See also
 List of railway stations in Japan

References

External links
Nagasato Station (JR Kyushu)

Nagasaki Main Line
Railway stations in Nagasaki Prefecture
Railway stations in Japan opened in 1990